Duncan Charles Home VC (10 June 18281 October 1857) was a recipient of the Victoria Cross, the highest and most prestigious award for gallantry in the face of the enemy that can be awarded to British and Commonwealth forces.

Details
Home was 29 years old, and a lieutenant in the Bengal Engineers, Bengal Army during the Indian Mutiny when the following deed took place on 14 September 1857 during the Siege of Delhi, India for which he, Lieutenant Philip Salkeld, Sergeant John Smith and bugler Robert Hawthorne were awarded the VC:

He was killed in action at Malagarh, India, on 1 October 1857.

The medal

The original medal was lost in 1920 when children of the then owner played "Soldiers" in a field near the house. Despite many searches, it has not been found.

References

Monuments to Courage (David Harvey, 1999)
The Register of the Victoria Cross (This England, 1997)
The Sapper VCs (Gerald Napier, 1998)

Further reading
Perkins, Roger. The Kashmir Gate: Lieutenant Home & the Delhi VCs. Chippenham: Picton Pub, 1983.

External links
Royal Engineers Museum Sappers VCs

1828 births
1857 deaths
People educated at Elizabeth College, Guernsey
British recipients of the Victoria Cross
Indian Rebellion of 1857 recipients of the Victoria Cross
British military personnel killed in the Indian Rebellion of 1857
British military personnel of the Second Anglo-Sikh War
People from Jabalpur
Bengal Engineers officers